Club Deportivo ONCE Andalucía was a wheelchair basketball team based in Seville, Spain.

History
ONCE Andalucía was founded in 1988 as part of the Spanish association ONCE. Since 1991, it competed in the top Spanish Wheelchair Basketball League, except in the 1994–95 season, when its berth was sold to the new creation club CD Fundosa ONCE.

After winning several Spanish competitions, in 2008 it won the André Vergauwen Cup, its only European achievement.

In 2011 the club was dissolved due to its financial trouble.

Season by season

Notable players
 Diego de Paz

References

Basketball teams in Andalusia
Wheelchair basketball teams in Spain
Sport in Seville